Adam Rankin "Tex" Johnson Sr. (February 4, 1888 in Burnet, Texas – July 2, 1972 in Williamsport, Pennsylvania) was a pitcher in Major League Baseball. His son, Rankin Johnson, Jr., was also a Major League pitcher. His father was the Civil War military leader Stovepipe Johnson.

He began his professional career with the Austin Senators of the Texas League in 1908.  His best season pitching was in 1916 with the Fort Worth Panthers of the Texas League.  His record was 15-12 in 35 appearances that year. Later in his minor league career he was a player/coach for four seasons (1923-1926). His last professional season was in 1926 for the Chambersburg Maroons of the Blue Ridge League.

External links

1888 births
1972 deaths
Baseball players from Texas
Major League Baseball pitchers
Boston Red Sox players
Chicago Whales players
Baltimore Terrapins players
St. Louis Cardinals players
Minor league baseball managers
Austin Senators players
Galveston Sand Crabs players
Dallas Giants players
York White Roses players
Binghamton Bingoes players
Syracuse Stars (minor league baseball) players
Fort Worth Panthers players
Milwaukee Brewers (minor league) players
Austin Rangers players
Vernon Tigers players
Harrisburg Senators players
Chambersburg Maroons players
People from Burnet, Texas